Total Drama World Tour (often shortened as TDWT) is the third season of Total Drama. The series' extension was commissioned by Teletoon from the producers, Fresh TV. The season's elements and plot structure is largely based on The Amazing Race, with the semi-final episode being a direct parody of the reality series.

In this season, fifteen returning contestants and two new contestants are taken on a trip around the world, and compete in cultural themed challenges of countries they visit. An added twist in this season is that they are required to break spontaneously into song, or else be immediately eliminated. The original cast from this and past seasons do not compete in the next season, Total Drama: Revenge of the Island, as there is a new cast. However, nine of these original contestants each have a cameo in the next season, while seven of them return to compete again in the fifth season, Total Drama All-Stars.

A spin-off series based on this season, The Ridonculous Race, premiered in September 2015.

Plot
As with the previous seasons, fifteen returning contestants and two new ones (Alejandro and Sierra, later three with the addition of Blaineley) partake in an elimination-based competition for the grand prize of C$1,000,000 (US$731,485.00), led by series host Chris McLean (Christian Potenza).

In this season, contestants are taken around the world throughout international based challenges and are required to break into song whenever Chris rings a special chime (usually forced and when a mishap happens; Bridgette gets stuck to a pole, the 15 contestants remaining fall off the plane onto Japan, the final four are attacked by a condor, etc.), or face instant elimination. There are 30 songs in total, and every episode takes place in a different location.

As the contestants are eliminated, they take the "Drop of Shame" by parachuting out of the plane in which the elimination ceremonies take place. When eliminated, they lose the chance at the million dollars (though such an elimination may not be permanent) and are forced to be sent home.

The winner of Total Drama World Tour is Alejandro in Canada, while Heather is the runner-up. However, in the American version and iTunes version, Heather is the winner. Beth, Eva, Geoff, Justin, Katie, Sadie, and Trent do not return to compete; instead, they appear on the aftermath special, sitting in the peanut gallery and on the last episode while cheering for the finalists, Alejandro and Heather.

However, as stated multiple times in following seasons, there was never any clear winner, as the money was thrown into a volcano by Ezekiel, making the money burn into ashes. This is the second season (the first one being Total Drama Island) in the series where no contestant wins anything.

This season's entire plot structure and elements is expanded into a related series called Total Drama Presents: The Ridonculous Race which aired in 2015. This series also takes place around the world and also features eighteen competitors (teams) like Total Drama World Tour, however whereas World Tour was still organized like Survivor, The Ridonculous Race was based on The Amazing Race.

Episodes

Total Drama World Tour is a Canadian animated television series which premiered on June 10, 2010 at 8:30 p.m. EST on Teletoon and it premiered on June 21, 2010 at 9:00 p.m. EST on Cartoon Network. It aired on ABC3 at 6:40 a.m. in Australia.

Episode finale variations
The show's producers created two alternate endings for the final episode, such that the winner seen in one country's broadcasts is the runner-up in other countries (and vice versa) where the show airs. Heather was shown as the first winner when Australia aired the season for the first time worldwide. Heather was also depicted as the winner in airings from Bulgaria, Brazil, France, Israel, Italy, Latin America, New Zealand, Norway, the Philippines, Portugal, Serbia, Singapore, Spain (including Catalonia), and in the United States. Canada then aired Alejandro as the winner, which was later aired in Croatia, Denmark, Finland, Hungary, the Netherlands, Poland, Romania, Russia, South Africa, and in Sweden.

Characters 
The main Total Drama World Tour cast consists of host Chris McLean, assistant Chef Hatchet, and the contestants. The remaining contestants from Total Drama Island and Total Drama Action  also appear in the show but serving in lesser capacities as commentators on The Aftermath.

Staff

Contestants

Elimination Table

Color Key 
  Finalist: This contestant made it to the final of the competition.
  Win (1): This contestant won the challenge and/or was immune from elimination.
  Win (2): This contestant won second place of the challenge and/or was immune from elimination.
  Lose: This contestant lost the challenge.
  Safe: This contestant was safe from elimination.
  Low: This contestant was at risk of being eliminated.
  Eliminated: This contestant was eliminated.
  Eliminated: This contestant quit, was evacuated, or got disqualified.
  This contestant is out of the competition.

Production

The season began production in 2009 when Fresh TV commissioned Teletoon to order new Total Drama episodes for an upcoming third season. This season was to be called Total Drama: The Musical when it first entered production. Keith Oliver and Chad Hicks directed this new season while two new voice actors, Marco Grazzini and Annick Obonsawin had to be hired if they wanted to voice the two new characters, Alejandro and Sierra. The season's title was later changed to the current title, Total Drama World Tour in 2010 upon the airing of Celebrity Manhunt's Total Drama Action Reunion Special due to the singing no longer being the main focus for this season.

Reception

Awards and accolades
Total Drama World Tour won numerous awards in 2011, from such outlets as the ToonZone Awards and the KidScreen Awards. At the ToonZone Awards, it won "Best Foreign Series," "Best Music Score on a TV Series," and "Best Voice Actress" for Annick Obonsawin. It was additionally nominated for "Best Original Song" for Oh My Izzy (sung by Scott McCord and Megan Fahlenbock), and "Best Voice Actor" for Carter Hayden. In the 2011 KidScreen Awards, the season won "Best Animated Series," "Best Voice Talent," and "Best Tweens/Teens Program."

Critical reception
Despite the many accolades and the enormous critical acclaim, some events of this season were severely criticized, such as the under-use of characters who had smaller roles in the preceding seasons, and the overuse of characters who had already won a preceding season or, at the very least, made it far into them. Other aspects of the season that had a negative reception were the creator's handling of Ezekiel (where he was turned into a feral monster over time), as many fans felt he was not given jusitifable character development; the constant losing streak of Team Victory and the love triangle between Duncan, Courtney and Gwen. The love triangle was eventually addressed in a video with the show's creators on Christian Potenza's YouTube channel, revealing that the breaking up of Duncan and Courtney was actually a network request, rather than a decision on the creator's part. Total Drama World Tour currently holds a 7.8 on Metacritic, which indicates "generally favorable reviews."

Media

DVD releases
Australia is the only country that released Total Drama World Tour on home video, which was released on a Region 4 DVD. The first part of the season was released in a Collection 1 DVD on April 3, 2013 while the second half of the season was released in a Collection 2 DVD on August 7, 2013.

Online website
Teletoon hosted a Total Drama World Tour based website starting in 2010 called Total Drama Online where people could play games and earn badges to win prizes, but was only available in Canada. The site was then replaced with universal games available to everyone in 2013, but removed all special features from the site.

See also

Notes

References

External links

Total Drama World Tour Virtual Flip Book from Cake Entertainment
Trailer on YouTube
Total Drama World Tour page from Cartoon Network
Total Drama Online from Teletoon

World Tour
2010 Canadian television series debuts
2010s Canadian animated television series
2010s Canadian satirical television series
Canadian adult animated comedy television series
Canadian children's animated comedy television series
Canadian children's animated musical television series
Canadian flash animated television series
2010 Canadian television seasons
2011 Canadian television seasons
Television shows filmed in Toronto